{{Infobox rail service
| box_width       = 
| name            = 
| color           = 
| logo            = 
| logo_width      = 
| image           = Øresundståg.JPG
| image_width     = 
| caption         = An Øresundståg at Copenhagen Central Station
| type            = 
| status          =Regional train (Sweden) Commuter train (Denmark) 
| locale          = Øresund Region
| predecessor     = 
| first           = 
| last            = 
| successor       = 
| operator        =Transdev, Skånetrafiken
| formeroperator  = 
| ridership       = 
| ridership2      = 
| website         = 
| start           = 
| stops           = 
| end             = 
| distance        = 
| journeytime     = 
| frequency       = 
| trainnumber     = 
| line_used       = 
| class           = 
| access          = 
| seating         = 
| sleeping        = 
| autorack        = 
| catering        = 
| observation     = 
| entertainment   = 
| baggage         = 
| otherfacilities = 
| stock           = X31K / ET
| gauge           = 
| el              = 
| speed           = 180 km/h
| owners          = 
| routenumber     = 
| maintenance     = Amager (Denmark)Hässleholm (Sweden)
| sharing         =
| map             = {{BS-map
 | inline = 1
 | bottom = Only one hourly Øresundståg will originate/terminate at Nivå.The timetable numbers are used in Swedish timetables. They are not used by any Danish operator.
 | map = 

{{BS2|hKRZWae+GRZq|||Öresund Bridge|Border: Sweden/Denmark}}

}}
| map_state       = collapsed
}}

Øresundståg is a passenger train network operated by Skånetrafiken and Transdev in the transnational Øresund Region of Denmark and Sweden. The name is a hybrid of the Danish Øresundstog and the Swedish Öresundståg, both meaning "Øresund train". The rolling stock, also known as Class ET in Denmark and X31K in Sweden, are electric passenger trainsets in the Flexliner family.

Operations
Three trains per hour cross the Øresund Bridge each way. Trains run at 20-minute intervals between Østerport via Copenhagen in Denmark to Malmö and Lund in southern Sweden, increasing to six trains per hour during rush hours. From Lund, the trains continue hourly in three directions, to Gothenburg, to Kalmar and to Karlskrona. After midnight, traffic is reduced to one hourly train between Østerport in Copenhagen and Lund.

Each train consists of up to three 79-metre-long units coupled together, each with 229 seats, providing a capacity of max 4122 seats per hour. This has turned out to be insufficient, as differences in salaries and house prices between Copenhagen and Malmö have resulted in an unexpected increase of cross-border commuting.

The trains cannot be lengthened because of platform length constraints. And increasing frequency beyond six trains per hour is not possible because there are only two platform tracks to share with other trains at the stations Nørreport, Ørestad, Kastrup Airport and Triangeln. Increasingly, people have to stand during rush hours, into Copenhagen in the morning and towards Malmö in the afternoon, which beside the inconvenience also raises safety concerns.

In Denmark, the trains run on the Coast Line and the Øresund Line, between Østerport and the Airport in 10-minute frequency. In Sweden, they run through the Malmö City Tunnel, and on the Southern Main Line to Lund. From Lund, most Øresundståg services continue to either Gothenburg, Kalmar, or Karlskrona, using the West Coast Line, the Southern Main Line, the Coast-to-Coast Line or the Blekinge Coast Line.

Passengers can encounter both Danish and Swedish staff on the trains over the Øresund Bridge. Tickets can be bought from sellers in either country. For travel inside one of the Swedish counties or inside Denmark, the local traffic authority tickets are used. For travel from Sweden to Denmark tickets can be purchased from the regional transit authorities and ticket sales channels which are part of the Resplus system.

Until December 2020, the trains were operated by Transdev in Sweden and by DSB in Denmark. In December 2020, Swedish rail operator SJ Öresund, a subsidiary of the state-owned operator SJ, took over the operations in Sweden. Due to an early cancellation of the contract with SJ, Transdev took over as a temporary operator in December 2022. At the same time, Skånetrafiken took over from DSB for operations in Denmark.

Operation 
On 27 June 2007 it was decided that DSBFirst was to assume responsibility from 2009 for the running of all Øresundståg services on the Øresund Line and connected destinations. DSBFirst started operations on 11 January 2009. In 2011, the Danish and Swedish ministries of transport instructed DSBFirst Sweden to cease operating the Swedish part of the service from 10 December 2011 Veolia Transport took over the Swedish side and DSBFirst Denmark's services passed to DSB Øresund.
The Øresundståg operation has suffered from financial problems as well as delays and cancelled trains on both the Danish and Swedish part of its network, notably during the 2010 winter.

On the Danish side the trains stop often, about every 4 km, like a commuter train. On the Swedish side the trains stop much less often, more like inter-city trains, and they reach stations about 300 km from Copenhagen, such as Gothenburg, Kalmar and Karlskrona. Most travellers in Sweden use it like a regional train for work commuting and similar shorter journeys, and local monthly passes are valid on the train.

The combination of routes of an inter-city nature in Sweden with commuter-like routes in Denmark is often a source of trouble. The long-distance trains from Sweden often accumulate delays during the long journey. But delays cause trouble to commuter passengers having fixed work hours and not wishing to add long margins, since they travel every day. Therefore, DSBFirst nowadays have stand-by trains ready at Kastrup that run to Helsingør if the train from Sweden is delayed. In these circumstances the train from Sweden is terminated early and does not continue to Helsingør.

Because of the complexity involved in the Øresundståg operation and the result of delays on the Danish side of the network, the decision has been taken to split the operations when the current concession ends in December 2021. The Danish services would be tendered by the Danish authorities, while Skånetrafiken will be responsible for the tendering process for the international and Swedish services.

Competitors
Between Gothenburg and Malmö (until 2012 to Copenhagen, but not to Helsingør), SJ AB (the Swedish national railway) operates competing trains. From 2009 they have different tickets compared to the Øresundståg services. SJ runs X2000 trains via Hässleholm, and from 2009-2011 SJ ran intercity IC3 (X31) trains using via Helsingborg. Confusingly, the IC3 train type is often referred to as the "Öresundståg". Different tickets are needed. There was a similar situation with DSB's "Intercity Bornholm" trains to Ystad, which did not accept Øresundståg tickets despite the "Øresundstog" rolling stock used.

ID checks from Denmark to Sweden

In response to the European migrant crisis the Swedish government mandated ID checks on all trains coming from Denmark from December 2015. As checks performed by the Swedish police took up to 20 minutes per train, timetables were severely disrupted. Beginning on 4 January 2016, transport operators would be fined if any improperly documented people were found to be brought into Sweden. As a result, DSB restructured the timetable, constructed a fence between the platforms at CPH Airport station, and introduced its own ID checks in order to gain entrance to the Malmö-bound platform at CPH Airport station. The frequency of trains across the bridge had been reduced to a maximum of 3 tph. Apart from the reduced frequency, services from Sweden to Denmark ran as usual to Helsingør during the day and Østerport in the evenings, with no ID checks entering Denmark. Since 4 May 2017 the line had changed to perform ID checks only at Malmö Hyllie station for trains travelling to Sweden.

As of 2023, frequency of 6 trains per hour during rush hour had resumed, and trains are timetabled to wait 6 minutes at Malmö Hyllie where the Swedish police check ID of alighting passengers.

Rolling stock
 ET / X31K 
The trains used are the fourth and latest generation of the IC3 family of multiple units, specifically designed for use in regional traffic in areas connected by the Øresund Line. They are electrically powered, and can run on both the Danish power supply and the Swedish power supply (15 kV 16⅔ Hz AC). Named Contessa by its manufacturer Bombardier, they are designated Litra ET in Denmark and Littera X31K (where X means electric multiple unit, and K means allowed to go to Copenhagen) in Sweden. The chassis is manufactured entirely of stainless steel, painted in a light shade of gray. Roughly half of the trains are owned by DSB and the other half by Transdev.

They are multiple units manufactured by Bombardier Transportation in Kalmar, previously known as Kalmar Verkstad and later in Hennigsdorf by LEW Hennigsdorf.

Each trainset is 79 metres long and weighs about 157 tonnes. The trainset consists of three carriages, giving a weight of about 52 tonnes per unit. Eight of the train's 12 axles are powered, which gives good acceleration. The train's top speed is 180 km/h. Each train costs 67 million Swedish kronor (2006), equivalent to 22 million kronor per unit.

The trainset has a total of 237 seats (79 per carriage), of which some are in a low floor carriage in the middle.

The train type is nicknamed "Øresundstog / Öresundståg" (Danish / Swedish), but they are used not only for services on the Øresundståg network, but also for some local Scania traffic, for the DSB intercity trains Copenhagen-Ystad, and formerly for some of SJ's Copenhagen-Gothenburg intercity trains. Even though these other trains do not in fact form part of the Øresundståg network, they often referred to by that name. In the summertime they are nicknamed "the longest sauna in Sweden"'' due to inoperative climate control.

A refurbishment program, including new exterior paint jobs, refurbished seats and new toilet systems for the train sets was started in 2016. The first refurbished train set was entered into service on March 15 2018.

All trains are maintained at the Helgoland depot in Amager and since May 2020 also at a new purpose-built depot in Hässleholm.

X32 
Due to a higher demand for comfort on the long-distance trains serving the line between Malmö and Ängelholm, SJ introduced the short-lived X32, a long-distance version of the X31. It had better comfort at the cost of less capacity. The second class section used seats from the first class section of the X31, while the first class section in the X32 used a more classic interior similar to the X2000 highspeed EMU. These trainsets entered service in 2006 and did not have permission to go to Denmark due to the interior being unsuitable for the commuter services in Denmark.
However, as more passengers started commuting between Denmark and Sweden, there was a need for extra trainsets so in 2007 all X32 were rebuilt into standard X31 sets.

References

External links
 Official Swedish website of Öresundståg 

Railway coaches of Denmark
Øresund Line
Passenger rail transport in Denmark
Passenger rail transport in Sweden
Rail transport in the Capital Region of Denmark
Rail transport in Skåne County
International rail transport
Multiple units of Denmark
Multiple units of Sweden
SJ multiple units
Rail transport in the Øresund Region